The Beebe Jail is a historic jail building in Beebe, Arkansas.  The small single-story concrete structure is set on an alley south of East Illinois Street on the east side of North Main Street.  It is distinctive for its slightly rounded concrete roof, with a parapet rising above the front (southwest) facade.  The interior has two small cells, each with a barred window, and a small vestibule area. The jail was built as a Works Progress Administration project in 1934.

The building was listed on the National Register of Historic Places in 1991.

See also
 McRae Jail
 Russell Jail
 National Register of Historic Places listings in White County, Arkansas

References

Jails on the National Register of Historic Places in Arkansas
Government buildings completed in 1935
Buildings and structures in Beebe, Arkansas
National Register of Historic Places in White County, Arkansas
Works Progress Administration in Arkansas
1935 establishments in Arkansas